Thomas Greaves (fl. 1604) was an English composer and lutenist.

He was lutenist to Sir Henry Pierrepont. He published in London in 1604 Songes of sundrie kinds. It contained four madrigals; three of them, 'Come away, sweet love,' 'Lady, the melting crystal of thine eyes,' and 'Sweet nymphs,' were republished in the nineteenth century (1843 and 1857), with pianoforte accompaniment by G. W. Budd.

References
Edmund Horace Fellowes (2007 reprint), The English Madrigal Composers, pp. 264–5.

Notes

References

External links

English classical musicians
17th-century English composers
English male composers
English lutenists
British performers of early music
17th-century male musicians